Elections for Hackney Council in London take place every four years.

Political control
Since the first election to the council in 1964 political control of the council has been held by the following parties:

Leadership
Prior to 2002, political leadership was provided by the leader of the council. The leaders from 1965 to 2002 were:

In 2002 the council changed to having directly-elected mayors with executive powers. The mayors since 2002 have been:

Council elections
 1964 Hackney London Borough Council election
 1968 Hackney London Borough Council election
 1971 Hackney London Borough Council election
 1974 Hackney London Borough Council election
 1978 Hackney London Borough Council election (boundary changes took place but the number of seats remained the same)
 1982 Hackney London Borough Council election
 1986 Hackney London Borough Council election
 1990 Hackney London Borough Council election
 1994 Hackney London Borough Council election (boundary changes took place but the number of seats remained the same)
 1998 Hackney London Borough Council election
 2002 Hackney London Borough Council election (boundary changes reduced the number of seats by three) 
 2006 Hackney London Borough Council election
 2010 Hackney London Borough Council election
 2014 Hackney London Borough Council election (boundary changes took place but the number of seats remained the same)
 2018 Hackney London Borough Council election

Borough result maps

By-election results

1964–1968
There were no by-elections.

1968–1971

1971–1974

1974–1978

1978–1982

The by-election was called following the death of Cllr. John V. Hill.

The by-election was called following the resignation of Cllr. Robert A. Dick.

The by-election was called following the death of Cllr. Arthur C. Harrison.

The by-election was called following the death of Cllr. John P. Dowling.

The by-election was called following the death of Cllr. Daniel West.

The by-election was called following the resignation of Cllr. Susan A. Gorman.

The by-election was called following the resignation of Cllr. George E. Armstrong.

The by-election was called following the death of Cllr. John C. Wobey.

1982–1986

The by-election was called following the resignation of Cllr. Jack W. Davidson.

The by-election was called following the death of Cllr. Henry Levy.

The by-election was called following the death of Cllr. Christopher W. Baxter.

The by-election was called following the resignation of Cllr. Mervyn E. Jones.

The by-election was called following the resignation of Cllr. Victoria S. M. Lubbock.

The by-election was called following the resignation of Cllr. Brian J. Weller.

The by-election was called following the resignation of Cllr. Walter Carmoody.

1986–1990

The by-election was called following the death of Cllr. Robert E. Owen.

The by-election was called following the disqualification of Cllr. Pierre S. Royan.

The by-election was called following the resignation of Cllr. Andrew Elder.

The by-election was called following the resignation of Cllr. J. D. Roberts.

The by-election was called following the resignation of Cllr. John A. Lettice.

The by-election was called following the resignation of Cllr. James Holland.

The by-election was called following the resignation of Cllr. Philip Stott. 

The by-election was called following the resignations of Cllrs. David F. Clark and Sheila A. Webb.

The by-election was called following the resignations of Cllrs. Felicity M. Harvest and Anthony G. Horrocks.

The by-election was called following the resignation of Cllr. Edward C. Barns.

The by-election was called following the resignation of Cllr. Peter D. J. Chowney.

The by-election was called following the resignation of Cllr. Brynley Heaven.

The by-election was called following the resignation of Cllr. John F. J. Bloom.

The by-election was called following the resignation of Cllr. William J. Upex.

The by-election was called following the resignation of Cllr. Lloyd King.

1990–1994

The by-election was called following the resignation of Cllr. Thomas A. Brake.

The by-election was called following the disqualification of Cllr. Ali M. B. Uddin.

The by-election was called following the resignation of Cllr. Jane Linden.

The by-election was called following the resignation of Cllr. Jean Khote.

The by-election was called following the disqualification of Cllr. Pauline Kerridge-Smith.

The by-election was called following the resignations of Cllrs. Paul Foley and Francis P. Reedy.

The by-election was called following the resignation of Cllr. Georgina M. C. Nicholas.

The by-election was called following the resignation of Cllr. Andrew S. Buttress.

1994–1998

The by-election was called following the resignation of Cllr. John T. T. Richards.

The by-election was called following the resignation of Cllr. Alison J. Rothwell.

The by-election was called following the resignation of Cllr. Madeleine M. Spanswick.

The by-election was called following the resignation of Cllr. Peter D. Hoye.

The by-election was called following the resignation of Cllr. Helen A. Cooper.

The by-election was called following the death of Cllr. Iain D. F. Pigg.

The by-election was called following the resignation of Cllr. Anne StClair Miller.

1998–2002

The by-election was called following the resignation of Cllr. Lorraine Monk.

The by-election was called following the resignation of Cllr. Paul A. Thomas.

The by-election was called following the resignation of Cllr. Irfan S. Malik.

The by-election was called following the disqualification of Cllr. Simon B. Parkes.

The by-election was called following the resignation of Cllr. Neil Hughes.

The by-election was called following the resignation of Cllr. Zev Lieberman.

The by-election was called following the disqualification of Cllr. Vernon E. Williams.

The by-election was called following the resignation of Cllr. Isaac Leibowitz.

2002–2006

The by-election was called following the resignation of Cllr. Jules Pipe.

The by-election was called following the resignation of Cllr. Louise McQuoid.

The by-election was called following the resignation of Cllr. Schneur Odze.

The by-election was called following the resignation of Cllr. Nihal Fernando.

The by-election was called following the resignation of Cllr. David Manion.

2006–2010

The by-election was called following the resignation of Cllr. Eric Ollerenshaw.

The by-election was called following the resignation of Cllr. James E. Carswell.

2010–2014

The by-election was called following the death of Cllr. Ms. Maureen Middleton.

The by-election was called following the resignation of Cllr. Alan R. Laing.

2014–2018

The by-election was triggered by the resignation of Councillor Sophie Linden, following her appointment as the London Deputy Mayor for Policing and Crime.

External links
 Hackney Council